Saint Louis (named for Louis IX of France, later canonised) is a Luxemotor hotel barge, on the Canal de Garonne in South West France.

History 
Built in 1923 by Gebroeders Boot in Alphen aan den Rijn in the Netherlands, Saint Louis was a bulk carrier and served on the Dutch inland seas and waterways carrying cargoes of grain and gravel until around 1985.  At that time she was converted for use as a supply vessel in the port of Amsterdam, using the name Supplier 2. In 1994 she was sold and then converted into a hotel barge.

External links
 Saint Louis hotel barge website

References 

Hotel barges
Barges of France
Hotels in France
1923 ships